Roselore Sonntag ( Stöbe, 6 February 1934) is a retired German gymnast. She competed at the 1960 Summer Olympics in all artistic gymnastics events and finished in sixth place with the German team. Individually her best achievement was 21st place in the balance beam. Between 1954 and 1960 she won 10 national titles, competing as Stöbe before 1957. After retirement she had a long career as a gymnastics coach.

References

1934 births
Living people
German female artistic gymnasts
Gymnasts at the 1960 Summer Olympics
Olympic gymnasts of the United Team of Germany